The Gloster Javelin is a twin-engined T-tailed delta-wing subsonic night and all-weather interceptor aircraft that served with Britain's Royal Air Force from the mid-1950s until the late 1960s. The last aircraft design to bear the Gloster name, it was introduced in 1956 after a lengthy development period and received several upgrades during its lifetime to its engines, radar and weapons, which included the De Havilland Firestreak air-to-air missile.

The Javelin was succeeded in the interceptor role by the English Electric Lightning, a supersonic aircraft capable of flying at more than double the Javelin's top speed, which was introduced into the RAF only a few years later. The Javelin served for much of its life alongside the Lightning; the last Javelins were withdrawn from operational service in 1968 following the introduction of successively more capable versions of the Lightning.

Development

Origins
In the aftermath of the Second World War, Britain identified a threat posed by the jet-powered strategic bomber and atomic weaponry and thus placed a great emphasis on developing aerial supremacy through continuing to advance its fighter technology, even following the end of conflict. Gloster Aircraft, having developed and produced the only British jet aircraft to be operational during the war, the Gloster Meteor, sought to take advantage of its expertise and responded to a 1947 Air Ministry requirement for a high-performance night fighter under Air Ministry specification F.44/46. The specification called for a two-seat night fighter, that would intercept enemy aircraft at heights of up to at least 40,000 feet. It would also have to reach a maximum speed of 525 kn at this height, be able to perform rapid ascents and attain an altitude of 45,000 feet within ten minutes of engine ignition.

Additional criteria given in the requirement included a minimum flight endurance of two hours, a takeoff distance of 1,500 yards, structural strength to support up to 4g manoeuvres at high speed and for the aircraft to incorporate airborne interception radar, multi-channel VHF radio and various navigational aids. The aircraft would also be required to be economical to produce, at a rate of ten per month for an estimated total of 150 aircraft.

Gloster produced several design proposals in the hope of satisfying the requirement. P.228, drawn up in 1946, was essentially a two-seat Meteor with slightly swept wings. A similar design was also offered to the Royal Navy as the P.231. The later-issued P.234 and P.238 of early 1947 had adopted many of the features that would be distinctive of the Javelin, including the large delta wing and tailplane. The two differed primarily in role; P.234 was a single-seat day fighter with a V-tail, while P.238 was a two-seat night fighter with a mid-mounted delta tailplane.

The RAF requirements were subject to some changes, mainly in regards to radar equipment and armaments; Gloster also initiated some changes as further research was conducted into the aerodynamic properties of the new swept and delta wings, as well as use of the new Armstrong Siddeley Sapphire turbojet engine.

Prototypes

On 13 April 1949, the Ministry of Supply issued instructions to two aircraft manufacturers, Gloster and de Havilland, to each construct four airworthy prototypes of their competing designs to meet the requirement, as well as one airframe each for structural testing. These prototype aircraft were the Gloster GA.5, designed by Richard Walker, and the de Havilland DH.110, the latter of which held the advantage of also being under consideration for the Royal Navy. Development was considerably delayed through political cost-cutting measures, the number of prototypes being trimmed down to an unworkable level of two each before the decision was entirely reversed; this led to the unusual situation where the first production Javelin was actually completed prior to the prototype order being fulfilled.

The first prototype was completed in 1951. An unusual feature of the prototypes was the opaque canopy over the rear cockpit. It had been believed that visibility outside the cockpit was unnecessary and a hindrance to the observer; the only external view available was through 2 small 'portholes'. Following a month of ground testing, on 26 November 1951, the first prototype conducted its first flight at Moreton Valence airfield. Bill Waterton, Gloster's Chief Test Pilot, would later describe the Javelin as being "as easy to fly as an Anson", although also expressing concern over its inadequate power controls. Disaster nearly struck during one test flight when aerodynamic flutter caused the elevators to detach in mid-flight; despite the lack of control surfaces, Bill Waterton was able to land the aircraft using tailplane trimming and engine thrust for pitch control. He was awarded the George Medal for his actions to retrieve flight data from the burning aircraft.

The second prototype (WD808) received a modified wing in 1953. After initial testing by Waterton, it was passed to another Gloster test pilot, Peter Lawrence for his opinion. On 11 June 1953, the aircraft crashed during testing. Lawrence had ejected from the aircraft, but too late (at about ), and was killed. The Javelin had experienced a "deep stall"; the wing acting like an airbrake had killed forward motion and at the same time degraded the airflow over the elevators, leaving them useless. Without elevator control, Lawrence was unable to regain control and the aircraft dropped from the sky. A stall warning device was later developed and implemented for the Javelin.

The third prototype (WT827), and the first to be fitted with operational equipment including radar, first flew on 7 March 1953. The fourth prototype (WT830) was passed to the Aeroplane and Armament Experimental Establishment (A&AEE) for trials and the fifth prototype, WT836, made its first flight in July 1954. On 4 July 1954, a prototype Javelin accidentally achieved supersonic speed during a test flight, the pilot having been distracted by an oxygen supply failure.

Production and further development
The official production order for the Javelin was issued in mid-1953; as the Gloster Meteor was still being actively produced by Gloster, considerable elements of the Javelin were subcontracted out to other aviation companies owned by the Hawker Siddeley Group, such as Armstrong Whitworth. While some delays were incurred, the Javelin's status as a "super priority" for production helped to minimise the time involved in producing each aircraft. On 22 July 1954, XA544, the first production aircraft, took flight at Hucclecote. Production was assisted by a large order placed by the United States Air Force, purchasing aircraft for the RAF as part of the Mutual Defense Aid Program at a price of £36.8 million.

On 21 October 1954, a pilot attached to Gloster from RAE Farnborough was killed while flying Javelin XA546 having entered what appeared to be an intentional spin. On 8 December 1955, a service test pilot S/L Dick was testing XA561 for the A&AEE when the aircraft entered a flat spin at 40,000 ft during manoeuvres testing the buffet boundary, which the anti-spin parachute could not stop, and he chose to eject at 8,000 ft. Following this, a stall-warning device was developed for the Javelin.

By the end of 1956, the Javelin was up to a FAW 7 variant, which was the first to meet the specifications of the original Air Ministry requirement, and which was to become the definitive version of the aircraft (most of which were later altered to the FAW 9 standard). The Javelin was evolving so quickly that deliveries of the FAW 8 began before FAW 7 production had ended. As a result, the final 80 FAW 7 aircraft went straight from the factory into storage, eventually flying after being re-manufactured as FAW 9s. A total of 427 Javelins were produced in all variants, plus seven prototypes. While there had been considerable interest from several NATO air forces, there were no export orders for the Javelin.

Design

The Javelin was the RAF's first purpose-built all-weather interceptor aircraft. Aerodynamic features of the type included its adoption of the new delta wing and a large tailplane. Fuel and armaments were housed in the delta wing, and the engines and crew in the fuselage. The delta wing and tailplane combination had been deemed necessary by Gloster for effective manoeuvrability at high speed and for the aircraft to be controllable at low landing speeds. In one instance during testing, when both elevators had been torn off by elevator flutter, the Javelin remained controllable by using both the trimming capability of the large tailplane and thrust changes to control pitch. Changes from the prototypes included alterations to the rear fuselage and a central "pen nib" fairing extending beyond the engine nozzles, to eliminate buffeting of the rudder by the jet exhaust and increased sweepback of the wing's leading edge to improve high-speed handling.

The Javelin was reportedly easy to fly even on one engine. The flight controls were fully power-assisted and production aircraft adopted a hydraulic 'feel' system for the pilot. The Javelin featured an infinitely variable airbrake; the airbrake proved to be extremely responsive and effective, allowing pilots to conduct rapid descents and heavy braking manoeuvres, enabling equally rapid landings to be performed. The turnaround time between sorties was significantly shorter than with the preceding Gloster Meteor, due to improved ground accessibility and engine ignition sequence. Unlike the Meteor, the Javelin was fitted with ejector seats, at the introduction to service of the type. No other operational fighter of the West even to the present day had a bigger wing, in terms of area, than the Javelin, and in the USSR, only the Tu-128 had a larger (about 10m2) wing.

In spite of the aircraft's unorthodox aerodynamic features, the Javelin had a fairly conventional structure and materials, being mainly composed of an aluminium alloy, with some use of steel edging. The fuselage was composed of four sections, the nose (containing the radar radome), the front fuselage, centre fuselage and rear fuselage; the nose and rear fuselage were removable for servicing and easy replacement. The engines were on either side of the centre fuselage, the internal space in the centre containing the service bay that housed much of the aircraft's electrical, hydraulic, and avionics subsystems. The engine air intakes were placed on the forward fuselage, running directly from beneath the cockpit rearwards into the delta wing. Electricity was provided by a pair of 6,000 watt, 24-volt generators driven by the auxiliary gearbox; inverters provided AC power for equipment such as some flight instruments and the radar.

Operational history

The Javelin entered service with the RAF in 1956 with 46 Squadron based at RAF Odiham, England. The Javelins were immediately put to use in an intensive flying programme, to rapidly familiarise crews with the type. The introduction of the Javelin was eased by the establishment of a partial Operational Conversion Unit, a specialised team to assist the members of other squadrons in converting to the type. During RAF trials, the type proved readily capable of intercepting jet bombers such as the English Electric Canberra and modern jet fighters, over a hundred miles out to sea.

A second squadron, 141, would be equipped with the Javelin in 1957, replacing the squadron's de Havilland Venom aircraft. The introduction of the Javelin allowed the RAF to expand its night-fighter activity considerably. By the end of July 1959, all remaining Meteor squadrons had been converted, many having been assigned to operate various models of the Javelin, including the newest FAW.7 variant.

The closest that the RAF's Javelins came to combat, was during the Indonesia-Malaysia confrontation from September 1963 until August 1966. Javelins of 60 Squadron, later joined by 64 Squadron, operated out of RAF Tengah, Singapore flying combat patrols over the jungles of Malaysia. On 3 September 1964, an Indonesian Air Force C-130 Hercules crashed into the Straits of Malacca while trying to evade interception by a Javelin FAW.9 of No 60 Squadron.

During June 1967, following the disbandment of 64 Squadron, 60 Squadron was deployed to RAF Kai Tak, Hong Kong because of unrest in the colony during China's Great Proletarian Cultural Revolution. No. 29 Squadron RAF of Javelins was also deployed to Ndola in Zambia during the early stages of Rhodesia's Unilateral Declaration of Independence, to protect Zambia from any action by the Rhodesian Air Force. A single aircraft was written off when its undercarriage failed on landing on 2 June 1966.

The last of the type was withdrawn from service in 1968, with the disbandment of 60 Squadron at RAF Tengah at the end of April 1968. One aircraft remained flying with the Aeroplane and Armament Experimental Establishment at Boscombe Down until 24 January 1975.

Variants 
A total of 435 aircraft were built by Gloster (302 built) and Armstrong-Whitworth (133 built); both companies at that time were part of the Hawker Siddeley group. Several were converted to different marks (sometimes repeatedly).
Gloster GA.5
Five prototypes GA.5s were built by Gloster, the first order for four aircraft  to Specification F.4/48 was placed by the Air Ministry on 17 Jun 1949. Subsequently two aircraft were cancelled but additional prototype aircraft were ordered in 1951:
WD804 - Unarmed first prototype with Sapphire Sa.3 engines first flown from Moreton Valance on 26 November 1951.
WD808 - Unarmed second prototype first flew on 21 August 1952.
WT827 - First flew 7 March 1953 it was the first armed aircraft and the first fitted with a radar. 
WT830 - First aircraft with powered controls, first flew 14 January 1954. Used for aerodynamic and stress trials.
WT836 - Production standard aircraft with improved canopy. first flew 20 July 1954
FAW 1
 Initial version with Armstrong Siddeley Sapphire Sa.6 engines with 8,000 lbf (35.6 kN thrust) each, British AI.17 radar, four 30 mm ADEN cannon in wings, and electrically operated tail plane;.  The designation FAW 1, sometimes written FAW.1 or F(AW) Mk 1, stood for "Fighter, All-Weather Mark 1". First flown on 25 July 1954, forty aircraft were built at Hucclecote, mainly used for trials and the first aircraft to be delivered to 46 Squadron at RAF Odiham. 
FAW 2
 Replaced the AI.17 radar with U.S.-made Westinghouse AN/APQ-43 radar (known as the AI.22 in RAF service), hydraulically operated tail; 30 produced.
T 3
 Dual-control trainer version with no radar, bulged canopy for improved instructor visibility. All-moving tailplane, lengthened fuselage to compensate for altered centre of gravity, adding additional internal fuel. Retained four cannon; 22 production aircraft and one prototype.
FAW 4
 Similar to FAW 1, with the addition of vortex generators on wings for improved stall characteristics, as well as an all-moving tailplane. Fitted with the original AI.17 radar of the FAW.1. 50 produced.
FAW 5
 Based on FAW 4, with revised wing structure incorporating additional fuel tanks, provision for missile pylons (never fitted); 64 produced.
FAW 6
 Combined FAW 2's American radar with the revised wing of the FAW.5. 33 produced. Snub nosed with AI.22 radar installed.
FAW 7
 Introduced new Sa.7 engines with 11,000 lbf (48.9 kN) thrust each, powered rudder, extended rear fuselage. Armed with two 30 mm ADEN plus four Firestreak air-to-air missiles. FAW 7s equipping two squadrons were armed with four ADEN cannon only; 142 produced. AI.17 radar installed.
FAW 8
 Upgraded Sa.7R engines with reheat, raising thrust to 12,300 lbf (54.7 kN) thrust above 20,000 ft (6,100 m); at lower altitudes, the limitation of the fuel pump caused a loss of cold thrust. New "drooped" wing leading edge and auto-stabiliser for better handling. Snub nosed with AI.22 radar installed.
FAW 9
 A total of 118 FAW 7s refitted with the revised wing and engines with reheat, of the Mk 8., 44 of these were fitted with refuelling probes as FAW 9F/R. AI.17 radar installed.
FAW 9R
R standing for "Range". A total of 40 of the 44 FAW 9F/R were refitted to carry underwing fuel tanks.

Several variants were proposed and investigated but not produced, including aerial reconnaissance versions, a fighter bomber version with underwing panniers for bombs, and a supersonic variant with area-ruled fuselage, thinner wings, and a new tail. The "thin-wing Javelin" would have been capable of about Mach 1.6, with a higher ceiling than contemporary US designs. Initial work started with fitting a thinner-section wing to a Javelin fuselage but as the project developed the changes became so great that it would effectively have been a different aircraft albeit having an outward resemblance to the Javelin. The Gloster P.370 to F.153D for "Thin Wing Gloster All Weather Fighter, an update of the initial F.118 specification was ordered in 1954; a prototype XG336  along with two pre-production aircraft.  The final incarnation of the thin-wing Gloster (P.376) just before cancellation was a large aircraft carrying two Red Dean all-aspect missiles as a possible contender for Operational Requirement F.155. The aircraft, then under construction, and the missile were cancelled in 1957.

Operators

 Royal Air Force
 Fighter Command
 No. 23 Squadron RAF : April 1957 to September 1964, initially based at RAF Horsham St Faith and then at RAF Coltishall, moving to RAF Leuchars in March 1963. It was equipped with the FAW.4 until April 1959, when it began to receive FAW.7s, which were in turn replaced by FAW.9s from April 1960. It re-equipped with the English Electric Lightning in September 1964.
 No. 25 Squadron RAF : March 1959 to November 1962, based at RAF Waterbeach until October 1961 when it moved to RAF Leuchars. It operated FAW.7s until December 1959 when it received FAW.9s.
 No. 29 Squadron RAF : November 1957 to February 1963 when it transferred to the Near East Air Force. It was based at RAF Acklington until July 1958 when it moved to RAF Leuchars, moving to Cyprus in February 1963. It operated FAW.6s until April 1961, when it received FAW.9s.  
 No. 33 Squadron RAF (1958–1962 disbanded)
 No. 41 Squadron RAF (1958–1963 disbanded)
 No. 46 Squadron RAF (1956–1961 disbanded)
 No. 64 Squadron RAF (1958–1965 transfer to Far East Air Force)
 No. 72 Squadron RAF (1959–1961 disbanded)
 No. 85 Squadron RAF (1958–1963 disbanded)
 No. 89 Squadron RAF (1958 re-numbered 85 Squadron)
 No. 141 Squadron RAF (1957–1958 re-numbered 41 Squadron)
 No. 151 Squadron RAF (1957–1961 disbanded)
 RAF Germany
 No. 3 Squadron RAF : January 1959 to December 1961, based at RAF Geilenkirchen and equipped with FAW.4s - re-equipped with the English Electric Canberra.
 No. 5 Squadron RAF : January 1960 to October 1965, based at RAF Laarbruch until December 1962, and then at RAF Geilenkirchen. Equipped with FAW.4s until November 1962 and then FAW.9s. It returned to Fighter Command in the UK in October 1965 when it re-equipped with the Lightning.
 No. 11 Squadron RAF : October 1960 to January 1966, based at RAF Geilenkirchen. Equipped with FAW.4s, initially, it was re-equipped with FAW.5s from March 1962 and FAW.9s from December 1962.
 No. 87 Squadron RAF (1957–1961 disbanded)
 No. 96 Squadron RAF
 Near East Air Force
 No. 29 Squadron RAF : February 1963 to May 1967, equipped with FAW.9s. It was based at RAF Nicosia, Cyprus until March 1964 when it moved to RAF Akrotiri. The squadron returned to Fighter Command and re-equipped with the Lightning in May 1967.
 Far East Air Force
 No. 60 Squadron RAF (1961–1968 disbanded)
 No. 64 Squadron RAF (1965–1967 disbanded)
 No. 1 Guided Weapons Development Squadron RAF Valley (Firestreak Trials)
 No. 226 Operational Conversion Unit RAF
 No. 228 Operational Conversion Unit RAF

Aircraft on display

Italy
Javelin FAW9 XH768 as XH707 at Cerbaiola.

South Africa
Javelin FAW1 XA553 gate guard at Thunder City, Cape Town (former gate guardian at RAF Stanmore Park).

United Kingdom

Javelin FAW1 XA564 at the National Cold War exhibition at the Royal Air Force Museum, Cosford, England.
Javelin FAW4 XA634 at Gloucestershire Jet Age Museum, England in No. 228 Operational Conversion Unit RAF markings coded L. (Former gate guardian at RAF Leeming).
Javelin FAW5 XA699 in No. 5 Squadron RAF markings at the Midland Air Museum, Coventry, England.
Javelin FAW9 XH767 in No. 23 Squadron RAF markings at the Yorkshire Air Museum, Elvington, England.
Javelin FAW9R XH892 at the Norfolk and Suffolk Aviation Museum Flixton, Suffolk, England.
Javelin FAW9 XH897 at the Imperial War Museum Duxford, England
Javelin FAW9 XH903 in No. 33 Squadron RAF markings coded G at the Jet Age Museum, Gloucestershire Airport, England on loan from the RAF Museum.
Javelin FAW8 XH992 in No. 85 Squadron RAF markings coded P at the Newark Air Museum, Newark, England.

Specifications (Gloster Javelin FAW Mk 9)

See also

References

Notes

Citations

Bibliography

External links

 Ejection history of Gloster Javelin
 Gloster Javelin MK4 XA632 in flight over Stonehouse Gloucestershire, early 1950s
 Thunder and Lightnings

1950s British fighter aircraft
Javelin
Twinjets
Delta-wing aircraft
T-tail aircraft
Aircraft first flown in 1951
Mid-wing aircraft